Didier Yamit Lugo Sichaca (born 10 September 1991) is a Colombian artistic gymnast, representing his nation at international competitions.  He participated at the 2009 World Artistic Gymnastics Championships in London, Great Britain.

References

1991 births
Living people
Colombian male artistic gymnasts
Place of birth missing (living people)
Gymnasts at the 2007 Pan American Games
Gymnasts at the 2015 Pan American Games
Pan American Games medalists in gymnastics
Pan American Games bronze medalists for Colombia
Gymnasts at the 2019 Pan American Games
Central American and Caribbean Games bronze medalists for Colombia
South American Games gold medalists for Colombia
South American Games silver medalists for Colombia
South American Games medalists in gymnastics
Competitors at the 2010 South American Games
Competitors at the 2010 Central American and Caribbean Games
Central American and Caribbean Games medalists in gymnastics
Medalists at the 2015 Pan American Games
21st-century Colombian people